Annie Frisbie is an American long-distance runner.

Amateur career
Frisbie was the Wisconsin large school Cross Country champion at River Falls High School.

She competed for the Iowa State Cyclones where she was an All-American in Cross Country.

Professional career
She took bronze at the 2021 US 10k Championships, the Peachtree Road Race.

Frisbie finished 7th at the 2021 New York City Marathon.  She led the marathon at the halfway point.

References

Living people
American female long-distance runners
Year of birth missing (living people)
21st-century American women
Place of birth missing (living people)